Notable people who served in the Foreign Legion. The following is a list of legionnaires who have gained fame or notoriety inside or outside of the legion.

Officers
 Alexandre Joseph Count Colonna-Walewski, non-marital son of Napoleon I
 Prince Aage of Denmark
 Dimitri Amilakvari - Georgian noble, became an iconic figure of the Free French Forces.
 Paul Arnaud de Foïard
 Crown Prince Bảo Long (Chữ nôm 保隆) of Vietnam - head of the Nguyễn Dynasty, the now deposed Emperors of Vietnam
 François Achille Bazaine - Marshal of France
 Prince Louis Napoléon - Prince Imperial
 Dominique Borella- French mercenary and anti-Communist
Augustus Buchel
 François Certain Canrobert - Marshal of France
 Jean Danjou - Commander at the Battle of Camarón
 Jules Gaucher - commander 13 DBLE, killed at Battle of Dien Bien Phu.
 Georges Hamacek
 John F. "Jack" Hasey
 Pierre Jeanpierre
 Aarne Juutilainen
 Pierre Koenig
 André Lalande
 Jean-Marie Le Pen
 Prince Louis II of Monaco
 Patrice MacMahon - Marshal of France
 Raoul Magrin-Vernerey
 Pierre Messmer
 Peter Ortiz, (Acting Lieutenant) 
 Henri, comte de Paris
 Zinovy Peshkov
 Rémy Raffalli
 Peter I of Serbia King of Serbia and SHS
 Jacques Leroy de Saint Arnaud - Marshal of France
 Hélie de Saint Marc - former resistant deported to Buchenwald, participated in the Algiers putsch.
 Gabriel Brunet de Sairigné - Colonel dead on duty in 1948, Compagnon de la Libération
 Pierre Segrétain
 Sisowath Monivong, 1908-9, then prince, later King of Cambodia
 Josef Šnejdárek- French legionnaire, officer and later Czechoslovakian general
 Susan Travers
 James Waddell - New Zealander in the French Foreign Legion

Enlisted
Léon Ashkenazi, also known as Manitou, Jewish philosopher
Arthur Bluethenthal, All American football player and decorated World War I pilot
Giuseppe Bottai, Italian minister
Eugene Bullard, First African-American military pilot
Blaise Cendrars, Swiss novelist and poet
Max Deutsch, Austrian composer
François Faber, Luxembourgian cyclist and Tour de France winner
Siegfried Freytag, German fighter ace
Jean Genet, French novelist, playwright, poet, essayist, and political activist
Ante Gotovina, former lieutenant general of the Croatian Army
Hans Hartung, German-French painter
Erwin James (Monahan), British journalist and murderer
Ernst Jünger, German writer
Aarne Juutilainen, Finnish army captain
Norman Kerry, U.S. actor
Moise Kisling, Polish painter
Billy Meier, Swiss ufologist, photographer
Arthur Koestler, Jewish-Hungarian polymath author
Raoul Lufbery, French-American fighter pilot and flying ace in World War I
Rodion Malinovsky, Soviet Marshal and Defence Minister.
Simon Murray, British businessman, adventurer, author and the oldest man to reach the South Pole unsupported
Peter Julien Ortiz, American, later decorated USMC officer and OSS operative in Occupied France during WWII (Also served in the Legion as an acting Lieutenant)
Radomir Pavitchevitch
Cole Porter, American composer and songwriter
Alex Rowe, serving British national
Akihiko Saito, Japanese hostage in Iraq who later died in captivity
Pal Sárközy de Nagy-Bócsa, advertiser, father of French President Nicolas Sarkozy
Alan Seeger, American poet
Rolf Steiner, Professional Soldier of Fortune in Biafra and Southern Sudan
Milorad Ulemek, Serbian former militant
Oswald Watt, Australian aviator
William A. Wellman, American film director
Mamady Doumbouya, Guinean Colonel

Honorary
 Dick Applegate
 Marcel Bigeard
 Christian de Castries
 Geneviève de Galard – nurse at the Battle of Dien Bien Phu, honorary Légionnaire de 1ère classe.
 Ante Gotovina - Croatian General
 Pierre Langlais
 Norman Schwarzkopf, Jr. Honorary Caporal (Corporal)

Notes

French Foreign Legion
Special forces personnel